The Melbourne Tramcar Preservation Association is a tram preservation society in Haddon, Victoria, Australia.

History
The Melbourne Tramcar Preservation Association was established 1974 as the Haddon Tramway Workshops. Its first purchase was a former Ballarat tram. It subsequently purchased a number of trams from the Melbourne & Metropolitan Tramways Board (M&MTB) and one former Victorian Railways tram.

A 35 by 14 metres shed was completed in 1979. For a time it also owned an ex M&MTB AEC Regal III and two Leyland OPS1s buses. The Melbourne Tramcar Preservation Association was incorporated in May 1984. A 650-metre demonstration track was opened in November 2000.

Museum

The museum, which opened to visitors on a regular basis in the late 1990s, allows visitors to see the collection of historic trams as well as have a behind the scenes look at the restoration process. It includes a 650m full-scale track on which operate W class trams that were part of Melbourne's public transportation system. The space is occasionally used for artists who want to encompass tramcars in their work. The museum's first purchase was a former Ballarat tram. It subsequently purchased a number of trams from the Melbourne & Metropolitan Tramways Board (M&MTB) and one former Victorian Railways tram. Six of the museum's eight cars are fully functional, including a restored "rescue car".

Collection

References

Museums established in 1974
Railway museums in Victoria (Australia)
Tourist railways in Victoria (Australia)
Tram museums
Transport museums in Victoria (Australia)
1974 establishments in Australia
Golden Plains Shire